Alkham is a village and civil parish in the Dover district of Kent, England, about five miles west of Dover. Within the parish are the settlements of Chalksole and Ewell Minnis; the parish population was 691 people (2001 census), reducing slightly to 688 at the 2011 Census.

Alkham's Grade I listed Anglican church is dedicated to St Anthony. The former Wesleyan chapel on Slip Lane is now a private residence.

The parishes of Alkham and River form the River ward in the Dover local government district.

References

External links

Villages in Kent
Civil parishes in Kent